I Need You Now is the debut studio album from Contemporary Gospel singer Smokie Norful. The album was released on May 21, 2002 through EMI Gospel and Chordant Records.

I Need You Now: Limited Edition was released on the same labels on October 21, 2003. It is a sequel to I Need You Now, not an extended edition. It contains new versions of four of the tracks in the regular edition plus four new tracks.

Track listing
All songs written by Norful, except where noted.

Regular Edition
"It's All About You" (Antonio Dixon, Smokie Norful) - 4:55
"I Need You Now" - 4:11
"Life's Not Promised" (Joe Archie, DOA, Haskel Jackson) - 3:58
"Still Say Thank You" - 5:31
"Praise Him" (Norful, Logan Reynolds) - 3:58
"The Least I Can Do" (Norful, Reynolds) - 6:01
"Somethin', Somethin'" (DOA, Norful) - 4:57
"Same Sad Song" (DOA, Norful) - 4:37
"Just Can't Stop" (Yashawn Mitchell) - 3:30
"Psalm 64" - 3:49
"Same Sad Song" (Urban Remix) (DOA, Norful) - 4:40

Limited Edition
"It's All About You" (Dixon, Norful) - 6:45
"Still Say Thank You" - 5:47
"You Gotta Right" (Marvin E. Wiley) - 2:33
"Praise Him" (Norful, Reynolds) - 4:59
"What I Need & What I Want" (Jamal H. Bryant) - 3:52
"He's All I Need" - 4:51
"I Need You Now" - 6:31
"O Holy Night" (Traditional) - 5:22

Awards
At the 35th GMA Dove Awards, the Limited Edition won a Dove Award for Contemporary Gospel Album of the Year.

Chart performances
The album peaked at No. 154 on Billboard 200, No. 26 on Billboard's R&B/Hip-Hop Albums, No. 13 on Billboard's Christian Albums, No. 6 on Billboard's Heatseekers, and No. 1 on Billboard's Gospel Albums. It stayed 104 weeks on the Gspel Albums charts and 38 weeks on the R&B/Hip-Hop charts. Also, the title song peaked at No. 96 on Billboard Hot 100.

The limited edition peaked at No. 90 on Billboard 200, No. 24 on R&B/Hip-Hop Albums, No. 3 on Christian Albums, and No. 1 on Gospel Albums. It stayed 55 weeks on the latter.

References

2002 debut albums
Smokie Norful albums